Daniel O'Boyle (died November 1933) was a Catholic Irish publican murdered  by Protestant loyalists in 1933.

This incident had been the first religiously motivated murder in Ireland since 1922, and initiated a series of violent acts between Catholic nationalists and Protestant unionists that ultimately led to the 1935 Belfast Riots.

References

Year of birth missing
1933 deaths
Murder victims from Northern Ireland
People murdered in Northern Ireland
1933 murders in the United Kingdom
1930s murders in Ireland